Skalka is a spa municipality and village in Prostějov District in the Olomouc Region of the Czech Republic. It has about 300 inhabitants.

Economy
Skalka is known for a small spa. Alkaline-sulphuric mineral springs spring here, which are used for therapeutic baths.

References

Villages in Prostějov District
Spa towns in the Czech Republic